All the Way Up may refer to:
All the Way Up (film), a 1970 British comedy film
 "All the Way Up" (Emily Osment song), a 2009 single
 "All the Way Up" (Fat Joe and Remy Ma song), a 2016 single